Mold railway station in Mold, Flintshire, Wales, opened on 14 August 1849 as the terminus of a double-track line from the Chester and Holyhead Railway, starting at Saltney near Chester. It was joined in September 1869 by Mold and Denbigh Junction Railway. In January 1892 a line opened between Mold and Coed Talon, which was extended in 1898 to Brymbo.

Closed
The extended service ceased in 1950. Mold station closed for passengers in 1962, and closed completely on 4 May 1964. The site of the station has been occupied since the 1990s by a supermarket.

References

Further reading

Disused railway stations in Flintshire
Railway stations in Great Britain opened in 1849
Railway stations in Great Britain closed in 1962
Former London and North Western Railway stations
Mold, Flintshire